Cristina Azpeitia Ramírez (born August 29, 1984), known under the ring name Chik Tormenta, is a Mexican luchadora, or female professional wrestler who is primarily known for her work for The Crash Lucha Libre. She is currently a freelancer working for AAA where she is a former AAA World Mixed Tag Team Champion along with Arez, as well as on the Mexican and independent circuit. Until 2022, Tormenta's real name was not a matter of public record, as is often the case with masked wrestlers in Mexico where their private lives are kept a secret from the wrestling fans.

Professional wrestling career

Independent circuit (2011-present)
Tormenta made her debut on the Desastre Total Ultraviolento (DTU) where defeated La Pantera.

On March 17, Tormenta defeated Keyra, Lady Shani and La Hiedra in a four-way match to win the AULL Women's Championship.

On October 9, 2019, Tormenta announced on her Facebook account that she was retiring indefinitely from professional wrestling due to her pregnancy, and would vacate all championships that she held.
She currently lost her mask near the summer of 2022 in a battle.

Lucha Libre AAA Worldwide (2018–present)
On July 13, 2018, Tormenta made her debut for AAA, one of Mexico's largest wrestling promotions. In her first AAA match she teamed up with Keyra and Arez, where defeated to Dragon Bane, Lady Maravilla and Star Fire. On August 2, Tormenta teaming with La Parka Negra, where defeated to Aero Star and Vanilla. Tormenta made a special appearance on the September 13, 2018 edition of Impact Wrestling Xplosion, which was taped September 13–14, 2018 at Mexico City's Frontón México Entertainment Center, she teamed with Arez and Latigo was defeated by Aramís and Dragon Bane and Star Fire.

On December 25, 2018, teaming with Demus and Toxin as representative of Liga Elite, winning to Team AAA (Chicano, Vanilla and Villano III Jr.). On March 16, 2019, at Rey de Reyes show, Tormenta competed in a Four-way match for the AAA Reina de Reinas Championship against Keira, La Hiedra and Lady Shani, which was won by Shani.

On October 11, 2021, Tormenta and Arez won the AAA World Mixed Tag Team Championship. They lost the titles to Tay Conti and Sammy Guevara in a four-way match at Triplemanía XXX: Monterrey on April 30, 2022. On June 18, at Triplemanía XXX: Tijuana, Flammer won the Lucha de Apuestas match and, as a result, Tormenta was forced to unmask and reveal her real name.

Impact Wrestling (2019)
On August 30, 2019, Tormenta made her debut for Impact Wrestling as part of the promotion's partnership with teaming with Jordynne Grace and Rosemary where they defeated Kiera Hogan, Madison Rayne and Vanilla.

Championships and accomplishments
Alianza Universal De Lucha Libre
AULL Women's Championship (1 time)
Generación XXI
G21 Women's Championship (1 time)
Lucha Libre AAA Worldwide
AAA World Mixed Tag Team Championship (1 time) – with Arez 
Martinez Entertainment
Metroplex Womens Championship (1 time)
New Wrestling Generation
NWG Divas Championship (2 times)
 Pro Wrestling Illustrated
 Ranked No. 146 of the top 150 female wrestlers in the PWI Women's 150 in 2021

Luchas de Apuestas record

References

1984 births
Living people
21st-century professional wrestlers
Mexican female professional wrestlers
Masked wrestlers
People from Guadalajara, Jalisco
Professional wrestlers from Jalisco
AAA World Mixed Tag Team Champions